Jolon (Spanish: Jolón; Salinan: Xolon) is small unincorporated village in southern Monterey County, California. Jolon is located in the San Antonio River Valley, west of Salinas Valley.

The origins of Jolon date to 1771, when the Spanish established Mission San Antonio de Padua, under the command of Saint Junípero Serra. The town was officially founded by Californios in 1849, when Antonio Ramírez built an inn as a stop on El Camino Real. Today, most of Jolon is occupied by Fort Hunter Liggett, an army installation.

History

Prior to the arrival of Europeans, the area was inhabited by the Salinan nation of Indigenous Californians.

Spanish period
The famed Portolá expedition, led by Gaspar de Portolá, camped on the San Antonio River near modern-day Jolon on September 24, 1769, having crossed the Santa Lucia Range from the coast. The party continued north through Jolon Valley.

Mission San Antonio de Padua was established two years later in 1771, under the direction of Junípero Serra, head of the mission system in California.

Mexican period
The Mexican secularization act of 1833 was devastating to Mission San Antonio de Padua, reducing its population from 1,300 in 1805 to under 150 in 1834. Following the mass exodus of Mission Indians from the mission, the small community was practically deserted, making Mission San Antonio de Padua the only mission not to grow into a town during the Spanish or Mexican periods.

In 1845, Governor Pío Pico declared all mission buildings in Alta California for sale, but no one bid for Mission San Antonio.

American period

The town was founded by Antonio Ramírez, who built an inn at the place in 1850.  The Jolon post office was founded in 1872. The inn later became a major Stagecoach Station on the route for travelers between San Francisco and Los Angeles.

The hotel changed owners several times before 1876, when H.C. Dodge sold it to Lt. George Hough Dutton (1825–1905) for $1,000 and 100 acres. Dutton added a second adobe story, wood-frame structures at either end, called the Dutton Hotel, listed on the National Register of Historic Places on October 14, 1971. In 1890, Captain Thomas Theodore Tidball, a friend of Dutton, established the Tidball Store, also listed on the National Register of Historic Places.

In the early 1920s William Randolph Hearst bought up thousands of acres in the rolling foothills of the Santa Lucia mountains east of Hearst Castle near San Simeon on California's Central Coast. He sent his architect, Julia Morgan, to the eastern side of the range, near Mission San Antonio, to design and oversee the building of a hacienda-style headquarters for the expansion of his ranching operation. The building was called the Hacienda Milpitas Ranchhouse, or simply the Hacienda.

Hearst sold his rancho to the U.S. Army in 1940. In preparation for World War II, the army established Fort Hunter Liggett as an important training center for the West Coast, still in operation today.

Geography

Jolon is located in the San Antonio River Valley of southern Monterey County, inland on the Central Coast of California.

Climate
This region experiences warm (but not hot) and dry summers, with no average monthly temperatures above 74.4 °F. According to the Köppen Climate Classification system, Jolon has a warm-summer Mediterranean climate, abbreviated "Csb" on climate maps.

Popular culture
Jolon is mentioned in the chorus of the song "South Coast"  as a place where, back in its frontier days, one could gamble.

Jolon is also the setting for John Steinbeck's novel To a God Unknown. The town is not mentioned in the book but is the basis for the fictional town in the book.

References

Further reading

External links

Unincorporated communities in Monterey County, California
Populated places established in 1850
1850 establishments in California
Santa Lucia Range
Unincorporated communities in California